Similac (for "similar to lactation") is a brand of infant formula that was developed by Alfred Bosworth of Tufts University and marketed by Abbott Laboratories. It was first released in the late 1920s, and then reformulated and concentrated in 1951. Today, Similac is sold in 96 countries worldwide.

History 

 1903 - Harry C. Moores and Stanley M. Ross launch the Moores & Ross Milk Company which specialized on bottling milk for home delivery.
 1925 - Alfred Bosworth creates an infant formula called “Franklin Infant Food”, later renamed to Similac.
 1928 - Company renames itself to "M &R Diatetic Laboratories", sells off its regular milk operations to Borden and focuses on infant milk.
 1950 - Company introduces "Similac Concentrated Liquid" in the USA, a non-powder infant formula.
 1959 - Company launches "Similac with Iron", an iron-fortified infant formula.
 1961 - Similac opens a new plant in The Netherlands, its first factory outside of the US
 1962 - Similac begins offering "Similac PM 60/40", for babies with specific medical conditions.
 1964 - Company merges with Abbott Laboratories
 1966 - Similac introduces "Isomil", a soy-based formula.
 1970 - Similac arrives in Israel
 1994 - Similac launches "NeoCare", a formula tailored to premature babies. Later renamed to "Similac NeoSure".
 1999 - Similac creates "Similac with Iron Ready to Feed" formula bottle. 
 2000 - Similac starts offering "Human Milk Fortifier".
 2002 - Similac introduces "Similac Advance with Iron", an infant formula with DHA and ARA.
 2006 - Similac launches "Similac Organic", a certified USDA organic infant formula.
 2011 - Simiilac launches "Similac Advance Plus", "Similac LeMehadrin" and "Similac Gentle" (lactose-free formula).
 2013
 Similac begins offering "Similac Human Milk Fortifier Concentrated Liquid" for preterm babies in NICUs.
 Similac launches a formula designed for breastfeeding moms who choose to supplement.
 Similac launches "The Baby Journal" app, Diaper Decoder and Ecodu developmental kits
 2014 - Similac promotes "Similac Breastfeeding Supplement" for nursing mothers
 2015
 Similac brings forward "Similac Advance NON-GMO", a formula with ingredients not genetically engineered.
 Similac delivers a "big hit" commercial, whereby Hilary and Haylie Duff teamed up with Similac "to help raise awareness against mom-on-mom bullying"
 2016
 Similac introduces "Go & Grow by Similac Food Mix-Ins", a supplement designed to mix into the food of toddlers.
 Similac begins offering "Pure Bliss by Similac", a formula starting with fresh milk from grass-fed cows that has no artificial growth hormones or antibiotics
 Similac launches "Similac Pro-Advance" and "Similac Pro-Sensitive", formulas containing 2’-FL Human Milk Oligosaccharide
 2022
 By February 2022, Abbott had initiated a voluntary recall of some Similac and Alimentum powdered infant formula (PIF) after finding evidence of Cronobacter sakazakii in some areas of Abbott's Sturgis, Michigan facility, known for manufacturing Similac, the leading PIF brand. In the United States, about 90% of the multibillion-dollar PIF market is controlled by only four companies, including Abbott, and the Sturgis facility is Abbott's largest. Most of Abbott's powdered formula was produced theremainly under the Similac brand namerepresenting 40% of the US market. The Office of the Commissioner of the Food and Drug Administration (FDA) published a May 2022 update on the recall of certain Similac, Alimentum and EleCare products as they investigate four cases of hospitalized infants involving Cronobacter sakazakii infection following the infants' consumption of PIF produced in Sturgis plant. Abbott shut down the Sturgis plant, out of an abundance of caution. There is no evidence that the infants' infections were caused by the powdered formula. The closure of the Sturgis plant for five months exacerbated the 2022 United States infant formula shortage which peaked in May. As of June 2022, the FDA was unable to prove a causal relationship between the deaths of nine infants who had consumed Abbott's PIF and Abbott products. The plant reopened in June.

Product Lineup 

Premature

Newborn & Infants

Toddlers

For Mothers

Ingredients 

Each formula contains various ingredients but most have OptiGRO, a mixture containing

 DHA
 Lutein
 Vitamin E
 Nucleotides
 Antioxidants
 Prebiotics

References

External links 

 
 Pure Bliss by Similac
 Similac App
 Similac App (iOS)
 Similac App (Android)
 Abbott Properties
 Similac Brands
 Section on Abbott Store

Infant feeding
Abbott Laboratories